The Kawasaki Z400 is a 399 cc Z series standard motorcycle introduced by Kawasaki as a successor to the Z300. It was unveiled at the 2018 EICMA in Milan, Italy. It is powered by a  liquid-cooled parallel-twin engine derived from the Ninja 400 sport bike.

2022 update 
The engine was made Euro 5 compliant.

References 

Z400
Standard motorcycles
Motorcycles powered by straight-twin engines